The Cornwall Council election, 2013, was an election for all 123 seats on the council. Cornwall Council is a unitary authority that covers the majority of the ceremonial county of Cornwall, with the exception of the Isles of Scilly which have an independent local authority. The elections took place concurrently with other local elections across England and Wales.

Background 

The elections for Cornwall Council were the second since its creation in 2009. Cornwall had previously been administered as a non-metropolitan county, with local government powers split between Cornwall County Council and the six non-metropolitan districts of Caradon, Carrick, Kerrier, North Cornwall, Penwith and Restormel. These were abolished as part of the 2009 structural changes to local government in England, which created a singular unitary authority. The elections in 2009 resulted in no group gaining a majority. The Conservative and Independent councillors formed a coalition to control the Council, choosing the Conservative Alec Robertson as the leader.

The Boundary Commission had undertaken a review of the Council's electoral divisions, which resulted in a number of changes to their boundaries and a reduction from 123 to 122 wards. One ward, Bude, would elect two councillors while the rest were represented by a single-member, leaving the number of councillors unchanged. All wards were contested in the election, with a total of 480 candidates standing across the county. The Conservatives had the most candidates with 103, followed by the Liberal Democrats with 91 and the United Kingdom Independence Party with 77 candidates. Labour fielded 68, Cornish party Mebyon Kernow had 27, the Green Party 23 and the Liberal Party stood one person. Ninety independents were also standing, with some wards having multiple independent candidates.

Elections to town and parish councils across Cornwall were also scheduled to take place on 2 May. However, not all council elections were contested, as the number of candidates was not greater than the seats available. Four parish councils with insufficient candidates would not have enough councillors to function after the elections. Councils that have vacancies after the elections would attempt to co-opt additional councillors.

Campaign 

The campaign was set against the backdrop of the Great Recession of the late 2000s, under a Labour government, and the subsequent public sector budget cuts of the Conservative-Liberal Democrat coalition government. There were also many issues that were pertinent to local voters in Cornwall, including the building of new houses, wind turbines, transportation infrastructure, jobs losses at the authority and the recent Council Tax freeze.

The Conservative Party, speculated to be facing losses, hoped to attract voters through their previous record as the major party in the outgoing Conservative-Independent council administration.

The Liberal Democrats, trying to become the largest party within the council, focused its campaign on cutting economic waste and increasing investment in transport infrastructure.

Mebyon Kernow highlighted the fact that they were an alternative to the parties and groupings that had made up previous UK government or Cornwall Council administrations.

UKIP, wanting to be seen as increasingly relevant to domestic politics, not just within Europe campaigned on issues of opposing the wind farm project and youth unemployment, but still highlighting its anti-EU stance.

The Labour Party focused its campaign on the fact that, at the time, there was worry as to whether the UK government's Help to Buy scheme could be used to fund the buying of second homes in the county, but was later announced to be untrue. The party also pledged to keep Council Tax rates low.

The Green Party campaigned on raising concerns over a proposed incinerator and overdeveloping land.

Eligibility 

All locally registered electors (British, Irish, Commonwealth and European Union citizens) who were aged 18 or over on Thursday 2 May 2013 were entitled to vote in the local elections. Those who were temporarily away from their ordinary address (for example, away working, on holiday, in student accommodation or in hospital) were also entitled to vote in the local elections, although those who had moved abroad and registered as overseas electors cannot vote in the local elections. It is possible to register to vote at more than one address (such as a university student who had a term-time address and lives at home during holidays) at the discretion of the local Electoral Register Office, but it remains an offence to vote more than once in the same local government election.

Composition before election

Election result 

|}

The changes in party councillors in this table differs from that listed by the BBC because it is based purely on changes from the previous election, not taking into account mid-term party defections or by-elections
The Independent grouping consists of those that were declared as "Independent" on the ballot paper, as well as those with no specification.

Outcome 
Following the election the council remained in no overall control with the Independent politicians becoming the largest grouping on the council through a modest gain of councillors from the previous election. The Liberal Democrats remained the second largest party after losing 2 councillors and the Conservatives slipped to third after losing over a third of their councillors. The Labour Party, UKIP, Mebyon Kernow and the Green Party all gained seats, with UKIP and the Greens entering Cornwall Council for the first time. Mebyon Kernow had had 6 seats prior to the election, having added 3 to their 2009 total, through defection and by-election. Following the election they held 4.

Within two weeks of the election the Conservative councillor for Ladock, St Clement and St Erme, Mike Eathorne-Gibbons, defected to the Independent grouping. Eathorne-Gibbons had been tipped to be the next leader of the Conservative group in the Council.

The Liberal Democrats reached out to all the other parties elected to Council, wanting to form a cross-party administration. The Conservatives decided not to join the alliance, after a lack of communication, therefore the Independents and Liberal Democrats formed a coalition administration with John Pollard of the Independents being elected leader of the council and the Liberal Democrats Jeremy Rowe as deputy leader. The Green councillor and the Independent councillor for Probus, Tregony and Grampound, Bob Egerton, formed a non-aligned independent group. The independent councillor for Wadebridge East, Collin Brewer, was not permitted to join the Independent grouping for his previous negative comments regarding disabled children. Brewer later resigned from Cornwall Council and the Liberal Democrat, Steve Knightley, won the subsequent by-election.

Electoral division results 

The electoral division results listed below are based on the changes from the 2009 elections, not taking into account any mid-term by-elections or party defections.

 John Keeling was previously the Independent councillor for Breage

 Loveday Jenkin had won a by-election for Wendron during the previous Council

Previous councillor Jan Powell had defected from the Conservatives to join the Liberal Democrats in June 2011

Previous councillor Armand Toms defected from the Conservatives to join the Independents in March 2013

Previous councillor Graham Eric Walker had defected from the Liberal Democrats to join the Independents in May 2012

Electoral division changes

References

External links 

 Election results at Cornwall Council website
 BBC News Cornwall Council results

2013 English local elections
2013
2010s in Cornwall